Roslyn National Bank and Trust Company Building is a historic commercial building located at Roslyn in Nassau County, New York.  It was designed by architect William Tubby (1858 - 1944) and built in 1931.  Located on the corner of Old Northern Boulevard and Remsen Avenue, it is a one-story, rectangular brick building with a flat roof in a modified Classical Revival style.  The front facade is three bays wide and features a Tuscan order wood portico with paired columns.

The building was added to the National Register of Historic Places in 1986. It was the home of the Tyrone Men's Clothing, Sportswear and Accessories store.

References

External links
Tyrone Men's Clothing, Sportswear and Accessories

Roslyn, New York
Bank buildings on the National Register of Historic Places in New York (state)
Neoclassical architecture in New York (state)
Commercial buildings completed in 1931
Buildings and structures in Nassau County, New York
National Register of Historic Places in North Hempstead (town), New York
1931 establishments in New York (state)